Lofos is a village and a community of the Elassona municipality. Before the 2011 local government reform it was a part of the municipality of Olympos. The 2011 census recorded 230 inhabitants in the village and 336 inhabitants in the community. The community of Lofos covers an area of 23.674 km2. The village was known as Pazarlades (Greek: Παζαρλάδες). Until the exchange of populations in 1924 and the arrival of the refugees from Pontus, mainly from Erbaa and Niksar, the village was inhabited by local Muslims.

Administrative division
The community of Lofos consists of two settlements:
 Asprochoma
Lofos

Population
According to the 2011 census, the population of the settlement of Lofos was 230 people, an increase of almost 38% compared with the population of the previous census of 2001.

See also
 List of settlements in the Larissa regional unit

References

Populated places in Larissa (regional unit)